Nollville is an unincorporated community on Tuscarora Creek in Berkeley County, West Virginia, United States. It lies west of Martinsburg on the Tuscarora Pike (County Route 15).

Located near Nollville are the Ridge Road Historic District and Tuscarora Creek Historic District, both listed on the National Register of Historic Places in 1980.

References

Unincorporated communities in Berkeley County, West Virginia
Unincorporated communities in West Virginia